This is a list of notable enterprise resource planning (ERP) software. The first section is devoted to free and open-source software, and the second is for proprietary software.

Free and open-source ERP software

Proprietary ERP vendors and software 

 1C Company – 1C:Enterprise
 24SevenOffice – 24SevenOffice Start, Premium, Professional and Custom
 3i Infotech – Orion ERP, Orion 11j, Orion 11s
 abas Software AG – abas ERP
 Acumatica – Acumatica Cloud ERP
 BatchMaster Software – BatchMaster ERP
 Consona Corporation – AXIS ERP, Intuitive ERP, Made2Manage ERP
 CGI Group – CGI Advantage
 CGram Software – CGram Enterprise
 Consona Corporation – Cimnet Systems, Compiere professional edition, Encompix ERP
 Ciright Systems – Ciright ERP
 Comarch - from the smallest to the biggest system: Comarch ERP XT, Comarch Optima, Comarch ERP Standard (Altum), Comarch ERP Enterprise (Semiramis)
 Deacom – DEACOM ERP
 Epicor - Epicor iScala, Epicor Eagle, Prophet 21
 Erply – Retail ERP
 Exact Software – Globe Next, Exact Online
 FinancialForce – FinancialForce ERP
 Fishbowl – Fishbowl Inventory
 Fujitsu Glovia Inc. – GLOVIA G2
 Greentree International – Greentree Business Software
 IFS
 Inductive Automation – Ignition MES, OEE Module
 Industrial and Financial Systems – IFS Applications
 Infor Global Solutions – Infor CloudSuite Financials, Infor LN, Infor M3, Infor CloudSuite Industrial (SyteLine), Infor VISUAL, Infor Distribution SX.e
 IQMS – EnterpriseIQ
 Jeeves Information Systems AB – Jeeves
 Microsoft – Microsoft Dynamics (a product line of ERP and CRM applications), NAV-X
 Open Systems Accounting Software – OSAS, TRAVERSE
 Oracle – Oracle Fusion Cloud, Oracle ERP Cloud, Oracle NetSuite, Oracle E-Business Suite, JD Edwards EnterpriseOne, JD Edwards World, PeopleSoft, Oracle Retail
 Panaya – Panaya CloudQuality Suite
 Pegasus Software – Opera (I, II and 3)
 Planet Soho – SohoOS
 Plex Systems – Plex Online
 Pronto Software – Pronto Software
 QAD Inc – QAD Enterprise Applications (formerly MFG/Pro)
 Quintiq
 Ramco Systems – Ramco Enterprise Series 4.x, e.Applications, On Demand ERP
 Sage Group – Sage 100 (formerly Sage ERP MAS 90 and 200), Sage 300 (formerly Accpac), 500 ERP, Sage X3, Sage Intacct
 SAP – mySAP, SAP Business All-in-One, SAP Business ByDesign, SAP Business One, SAP Business Suite, SAP S/4HANA
 Sescoi – MyWorkPLAN, WorkPLAN Enterprise
 Syspro – SYSPRO
 Tally Solutions – Tally.ERP 9
 Tata Consultancy Services – iON
 Technology One – Technology One
 TradeCard – TradeXpress
 Transtek – Compass ERP
 UFIDA – UFIDA NC, UFIDA ERP-U8 All-in-one, UFIDA U9
 Unit4 – Coda Financials, UNIT4 Business World
 Visma – Visma Business, Visma.net ERP, Visma Global
 Workday, Inc. – Workday
 Works Applications – AI Works

See also
 List of project management software
 ERP system selection methodology
 Comparison of accounting software

References

 
ERP software
Accounting software